HLA-DR09 (DR9) is a HLA-DR serotype that recognizes the DRB1*0901 gene product.

Serology

The serological reaction of DR9 is relatively good. The serology of DRB1*0902 to *0906 serotypes is unknown.

Disease associations
DRB1*0901: Early childhood myasthenia gravis

Extended linkage
DRB1*0901:DQA1*0301:DQB1*0303 haplotype: Early childhood myastenia gravis

Genetic linkage

HLA-DR9 is genetically linked to HLA-DR53, and  HLA-DQ3 and DQ9 serotypes.

References

9